A benevolent dictatorship is a government in which an authoritarian leader exercises absolute political power over the state, but is perceived to do so with regard for benefit  of the population as a whole, standing in contrast to the decidedly malevolent stereotype of a dictator who focuses on their supporters and their own self-interests. A benevolent dictator may allow for some civil liberties or democratic decision-making to exist, such as through public referendums or elected representatives with limited power, and can make preparations for a transition to genuine democracy during or after their term.

Characteristics 
Economist William Easterly defines benevolent autocrats as "leaders in non-democratic polities who receive credit for high growth." He notes that it is a popular and politically convenient story but goes on to argue that the concept is not supported by theory or evidence.

Modern usage of the term in a world society where the norm leans much more toward democracy can be traced back to John Stuart Mill in his classic On Liberty (1869). Although he argued in favor of democratic rights for individuals, he did make an exception for what he called today's developing countries. He wrote: "We may leave out of consideration those backward states of society in which the race itself may be considered as in its nonage. Despotism is ... legitimate ... in dealing with barbarians, provided the end be their improvement ... . Liberty ... has no application to any state of things anterior to the time when mankind have become capable of being improved by free and equal discussion."

Benevolent dictator was a popular rhetoric in the early 20th century as a support for colonial rulings. A British colonial official called Lord Hailey said in the 1940s: "A new conception of our relationship...may emerge as part of the movement for the betterment of the backward peoples of the world". Hailey conceived economic development as a justification for colonial power.

In the Spanish language, the pun word  is sometimes used for a dictatorship conserving some of the liberties and mechanisms of democracy. In February 2009, the Brazilian newspaper Folha de S.Paulo ran an editorial classifying the military dictatorship in Brazil (1964–1985) as a "", creating controversy.

Mancur Olson characterized dictators as "not like the wolf that preys on the elk, but more like the rancher who makes sure his cattle are protected and are given water", arguing that they have an incentive to provide public goods at the same time they extract the largest possible surplus for themselves.

Historical examples

Lucius Quinctius Cincinnatus 

Lucius Quinctius Cincinnatus was an opponent of the rights of the plebeians (the common citizens) who fell into poverty because of his son Caeso Quinctius's violent opposition to their desire for a written code of equally enforced laws. He worked his own small farm until he was called upon to provide leadership during an invasion by the Aequi, Rome's neighbours to the East. An initial Aequi victory caused panic in Rome, whereupon the Senate voted to appoint Cincinnatus as dictator for six months. A group of senators was sent to Cincinnatus' farm to inform him of his new role, finding him while he was ploughing his farm. On learning of the military reverse, Cincinnatus put on his senatorial toga and went to Rome, where he organized a relief force. Sixteen days later, Cincinnatus's army defeated the Aequi and ended the war. Cincinnatus then gave up his dictatorial powers and returned to his farm. His success and immediate resignation of his near-absolute authority with the end of this crisis (traditionally dated to 458 BC) has often been cited as an example of outstanding leadership, service to the greater good, civic virtue, humility, and modesty.

Modern examples

Mustafa Kemal Atatürk 
The Policy Wire sees Mustafa Kemal Atatürk as a benevolent dictator due to his leadership of the Turkish War of Independence from 1919 to 1923 and his presidency from 1923 to 1938. He was credited with removing foreign influence from former Ottoman territory, and is looked fondly upon as the founder of modern Turkey in the form of a republic. 

As the president of the newly formed Turkish Republic, Atatürk initiated a rigorous program of political, economic, and cultural reforms with the ultimate aim of building a modern and progressive nation. He made Republic of Turkey a secular state. Secularism in Turkey derives from Mustafa Kemal Atatürk's Six Arrows: republicanism, populism, laïcité, reformism, nationalism and statism. He made primary education free and compulsory, opening thousands of new schools all over the country. Turkish women received equal civil and political rights during Atatürk's presidency. In particular, women were given voting rights in local elections by Act no. 1580 on 3 April 1930 and a few years later, in 1934, full universal suffrage. Alexander Rüstow also defined his rule as a benevolent dictatorship.

Josip Broz Tito 
Although Josip Broz Tito led the former Socialist Federal Republic of Yugoslavia as Prime Minister and President (later President for Life) from 1944 until his death in 1980 under what many criticized as authoritarian rule,
according to author Susan G. Shapiro, he was widely popular and was seen by most as a benevolent dictator. He was a popular public figure both in Yugoslavia and abroad. 

Viewed as a unifying symbol especially retrospectively after the events of the violent breakup of Yugoslavia, his internal policies maintained the peaceful coexistence of the nations of the Yugoslav federation. The country's economy underwent a period of prosperity under the system of workers' self-management devised by his deputy Edvard Kardelj. Tito gained further international attention as the chief leader of the Non-Aligned Movement.

Lee Kuan Yew 
Since gaining independence on 9 August 1965, Singapore in just a few decades has transformed from a relatively underdeveloped and impoverished agrarian society into Asia's most developed nation and one of the wealthiest, as a centre of aviation, international banking, business, tourism and shipping. Singapore has thus been dubbed as one of the Four Asian Tigers. Lee Kuan Yew and his administration wielded absolute reign over Singaporean politics until 1990, while his People's Action Party has remained in power ever since, controlling Singapore as a dominant-party state. Therefore, Lee has been referred to as a benevolent dictator. 

As a leader who was in power for thirty-one years from 1959 until 1990, he implemented some laws that were deemed by some observers to be autocratic, and attempted to dismantle political opposition by engaging in defamation lawsuits. Despite this, he is reportedly often looked upon favorably by Singaporeans for his transformation of Singapore. Peter Popham of The Independent called Lee "one of the most successful political pragmatists".

Ever since Lee's retirement as prime minister in 1990 and his death in 2015, Singapore has undergone more democratisation with increased political participation by other parties, most notably the Workers' Party, as well as the office of the Leader of the Opposition being created. Despite this, the Government of Singapore continues to be criticised for not implementing freedom of speech like their Western counterparts.

France-Albert René 
France-Albert René has been characterized as a prime example of a benevolent dictatorship, nearly eliminating poverty from the Seychelles. René created a universal health system, increased the literacy rate to 90%, and led his country to the point of being the most developed country in Africa – as measured by the Human Development Index – helping build one of the continent's highest gross domestic products per capita. His supporters believe that he had solid social priorities, including his government's extensive funding of education, health care and the environment. Critical indicators, such as infant mortality, literacy rate, and economic well-being, are among the best in the continent. During his rule, the Seychelles avoided the volatile political climate and underdevelopment in neighbouring island countries such as the Comoros and Madagascar.

However, the Truth Reconciliation and National Unity Commission (TRNUC) in 2018 heard testimony from people who had been tortured, and from relatives of people who had been murdered, tortured, disappeared, assassinated, detained without trial, as well as evidence of financial crimes and looting of the state and private individuals.

See also 

Absolute monarchy
Benevolent dictator for life (related concept in terms of software)
Dictablanda
Enlightened absolutism
Meritocracy
Philosopher king
Separation of powers
Social planner
Soft despotism

References 

Authoritarianism
Political systems